Bernard Brinkman (June 8, 1926 – April 24, 2006) was an American politician who served in the Minnesota House of Representatives from 1965 to 1987.

He died of a heart attack on April 24, 2006, in Paynesville, Minnesota at age 79.

References

1926 births
2006 deaths
Democratic Party members of the Minnesota House of Representatives
20th-century American politicians